Drug Scenes (original French title Scénarios sur la drogue, also titled Drugs!) is an omnibus film (2000) of 24 French short films depicting drug abuse. Varying in length from three to seven minutes, they showed in movie theaters before feature films.

Directors included Georges Lautner, Etienne Chatiliez, Emmanuelle Bercot, Santiago Otheguy, Diane Bertrand, Jean Bocheux, Laurent Bouhnik, and Manuel Boursinhac.

Actors include Sylvie Testud, Chiara Mastroianni, Valeria Bruni-Tedeschi, Nathalie Richard, Manuel Blanc, Claude Jade, Pierre Richard, Éva Darlan, Lou Doillon, Michèle Garcia and Mathieu Delarive.

Scriptwriters included Eric Ellena.

External links
 Scénarios sur la drogue, official site
 

2000 films
Films about drugs
Films directed by Georges Lautner
Films directed by Guillaume Nicloux
French crime drama films
2000s crime drama films
French drama short films
Films directed by Marion Vernoux
Films directed by Vincent Pérez
Films directed by Laurent Bouhnik
2000 drama films
2000s French films